Huckleberry Finn is a surviving American silent dramatic rural film from 1920, based on Mark Twain's 1884 classic Adventures of Huckleberry Finn. It was produced by Famous Players-Lasky and distributed through Paramount Pictures. William Desmond Taylor directed Huckleberry Finn, as he had the 1917 film version of Tom Sawyer, using a scenario written by Julia Crawford Ivers, who also had been the writer for Tom Sawyer.

It was the first version of the story entirely entrusted to a youth cast. Lewis Sargent (Huck) and Gordon Griffith (Tom) were child actors who already had a long and successful career and were well known to the public.

Plot
As described in a film publication, Huckleberry Finn (Sargent) has been adopted by the Widow Douglas (K. Griffith) who plans to "civilize" him. With Tom Sawyer (G. Griffith) he forms a robber gang, and in a cave has the local boys take an oath to stick together. In his bedroom he runs into his no-account father (Lanning) who steals Huck's small change and later kidnaps Huck, taking him in a small boat down the river, while Tom and the gang wait for their leader to appear. Huck later escapes from a cabin where his father mistreated him, making it look as if he drowned while getting away in a canoe.

Rumors of Huck's death spreads. Jim (Reed), the widow's slave boy, hears that he is to be sold and runs off, and joins Huck on a raft. Duke (Humphrey) and King (Bates), two broken-down actors fleeing a crowd they had fooled with a mock theatrical performance, join them. At the next town the actors again fool the people with a pretend theatrical performance with Huck acting as the doorkeeper. Further downstream the actors then impersonate the brothers of a deceased man named Wilks in an attempt to obtain the inheritance, but Huck takes the money to keep it from the actors after he is smitten by the daughter, Mary Jane Wilks (Ralston). Huck and Jim leave to escape the wrath of their former companions just as the actual relatives of the dead man show up.

After peace is made when King and Duke rejoin the group, a shabby trick is performed when King sells Jim to a man named Phelps and then tells Huck that Jim has been lost. Upon learning the truth, Huck sets out to rescue his friend. He discovers that Mrs. Phelps (Moore) is the sister of Tom's Aunt Polly. Huck poses as the nephew Tom, whom Mrs. Phelps has never met. Then the real Tom arrives, who is surprised as he believed that Huck had died. After exchanging signals, Tom poses as his brother Sid and they go through with a plan. In a struggle to get Jim away, Tom is shot in the leg. Jim escapes, and while the two youngsters are congratulating themselves at Tom's sickbed, Aunt Polly arrives and says that Jim had been freed a month earlier. She informs the Phelps of Huck's actual identity and takes him back, cured of his wandering, to the Widow Douglas.

Cast
Lewis Sargent – Huckleberry Finn
Katherine Griffith – Widow Douglas
Martha Mattox – Miss Watson
Frank Lanning – Huck's father
Orral Humphrey – The Duke
Tom Bates – The King (*as Tom D. Bates)
Gordon Griffith – Tom Sawyer
Edythe Chapman – Aunt Polly
Thelma Salter – Becky Thatcher
George H. Reed – Jim
L. M. Wells – Judge Thatcher
Harry L. Rattenberry – Uncle Harvey
Esther Ralston – Mary Jane Wilks
Fay Lemport – Johanna
Eunice Murdock Moore – Mrs. Sally Phelps (*as Eunice Van Moore)

Unbilled

Tom Ashton - An Aged Pirate
Howard Ralston - One of the Boys

Preservation status
This film has been restored by the International Film and Photography Museum at George Eastman House.

References

External links

Huck Finn's First Film at Mark Twain in His Times, Stephen Railton, University of Virginia (has several stills)
Trailer for restored version of film, George Eastman House, youtube.com

1920 films
American silent feature films
Paramount Pictures films
Films directed by William Desmond Taylor
Films based on Adventures of Huckleberry Finn
American black-and-white films
Films set in the 19th century
Silent American drama films
1920 drama films
Surviving American silent films
1920s American films